Mark Naylor  (born 10 September 1957 in York, Yorkshire) is a retired male high jumper from England.

Athletics career
Naylor twice represented Great Britain at the Summer Olympics: 1980 and 1984. He was a member of Hillingdon Athletic Club during his career. Naylor set his personal best (2.24 metres) in 1980. He represented England in the high jump event, at the 1978 Commonwealth Games in Edmonton, Alberta, Canada.

References

1957 births
Living people
Sportspeople from York
English male high jumpers
Olympic athletes of Great Britain
Athletes (track and field) at the 1980 Summer Olympics
Athletes (track and field) at the 1984 Summer Olympics
Commonwealth Games competitors for England
Athletes (track and field) at the 1978 Commonwealth Games